Krusty's Fun House is a puzzle video game based on the animated sitcom The Simpsons.

Gameplay
The player directs small rats to an extermination area through complicated maze-like levels. The player controls Krusty the Clown, who must navigate through his Krusty Brand Fun House. Each level is a puzzle in which a number of rats must be exterminated. Using different objects and obstacles, Krusty must create a path for the rats to follow and guide them towards an extermination device. Other creatures such as snakes, martians, flying pigs and birds attempt to hinder Krusty's progress by injuring him; he must throw pies in order to defeat them.

In each stage the extermination devices are run by a different character, including Bart, Homer, Corporal Punishment and Sideshow Mel.

Development 
Originally released as Rat-Trap on the Amiga, it was developed by Fox Williams for the British software house Audiogenic, who licensed it to Acclaim Entertainment, the U.S.-based publishers of a range of games based on The Simpsons.

Release 
The game was released in 1992 for the Amiga, NES, IBM PC compatibles, Master System, Game Gear, Game Boy, Super NES and Mega Drive/Genesis. Acclaim published the console versions, and sub-licensed the home computer versions to Virgin. The 16-bit versions on the Super NES and the Mega Drive/Genesis were entitled Krusty's Super Fun House.

There are two revisions of the Super NES and Genesis games. Version 1.1 has completely different music for the second and fourth world.

Reception

Super Play magazine gave the SNES version of Krusty a 79 percent rating and wrote "it's actually pretty good fun to play, although perhaps more of a Younger Player-oriented game than anything else. Not one to set your heart on fire, but a good solid game nevertheless." Computer Gaming World in April 1994 said that the computer version "is an above average arcade/strategy game that is ideal to burn away half an hour or so". In 1995, Total! ranked the game 75th on their Top 100 SNES Games summarizing: "A sort of reverse Lemmings in which you have to kill the little on-screen characters."

References

External links
 Krusty's Super Fun House on MobyGames

1992 video games
Acclaim Entertainment games
DOS games
Game Boy games
Game Gear games
Nintendo Entertainment System games
Puzzle video games
Master System games
Sega Genesis games
Super Nintendo Entertainment System games
Amiga games
Video games about clowns
Video games based on The Simpsons
Video games scored by David Whittaker
Video games developed in the United Kingdom
Single-player video games